Jacksonville is an unincorporated community and census-designated place in Jackson Township, Shelby County, Iowa, in the United States.  As of the 2010 Census the population of Jacksonville was 30.

Demographics

History
Jacksonville was originally built up chiefly by the Danish. Jacksonville's population was 12 in 1902, and 75 in 1925.

Education
The Harlan Community School District operates local public schools.  The district serves the towns of Harlan, Defiance, Earling, Panama, Portsmouth and Westphalia, the unincorporated communities of Jacksonville and Corley, and the surrounding rural areas.

References

Unincorporated communities in Shelby County, Iowa